The 1962 Virginia Cavaliers football team represented the University of Virginia during the 1962 NCAA University Division football season. The Cavaliers were led by second-year head coach Bill Elias and played their home games at Scott Stadium in Charlottesville, Virginia. They competed as members of the Atlantic Coast Conference, finishing in seventh.

Schedule

Source:

References

Virginia
Virginia Cavaliers football seasons
Virginia Cavaliers football